Jerod Swallow (born October 18, 1966) is an American ice dancer. With his wife Elizabeth Punsalan, he is a five-time U.S. national champion, two-time Skate America champion, and competed twice in the Winter Olympics.

Personal life 
Jerod Swallow was born October 18, 1966 in Ann Arbor, Michigan. He married Elizabeth Punsalan in September 1993.

Career

Early career 
Swallow competed in two disciplines at the 1985 World Junior Championships, placing fourth in pair skating with Shelly Propson and fourth in ice dancing with Jodie Balogh. He and Propson withdrew from the 1986 U.S. Championships after an accident in a practice session. She hit her head when she fell from a lift and was taken to the hospital where she recovered quickly.

Partnership with Punsalan 
Swallow teamed up with Elizabeth Punsalan in mid-1989. They were initially coached by Sandy Hess in Colorado Springs, Colorado. They placed 7th at 1989 Skate America and 5th at the 1990 U.S. Championships. The following season, they won their first U.S. national title. They were one of the favorites for the 1992 Olympic team but at the 1992 U.S. Championships, Swallow fell during the free dance and they finished in third. Swallow was ready to leave competition for show skating but Punsalan persuaded him to continue.

In 1992, Punsalan/Swallow began working with Igor Shpilband for choreography in Detroit. By the 1993–94 season, he had become their head coach. The couple developed a rivalry with Renee Roca / Gorsha Sur, who had earlier choreographed a program for them and trained alongside them. The U.S. had a single berth to the ice dancing event at the 1994 Winter Olympics. Punsalan and Swallow were involved in a letter-writing campaign to Congress to prevent Sur from receiving expedited citizenship, which would allow him to compete at the 1994 Olympics. At the U.S. Championships in January 1994, Punsalan and Swallow placed first in the original dance, ahead of their injured rivals in second. Roca/Sur withdrew before the free dance and Punsalan/Swallow went on to win their second national title and were named to the Olympic team. They competed at the 1994 Olympics only two weeks after her father's death, finishing 15th.

Punsalan/Swallow won silver at the 1995 U.S. Championships behind Roca/Sur but finished ahead of them the following year to take their third national title. Punsalan/Swallow won another two national titles at the 1997 and 1998 U.S. Championships. They placed 7th at the 1998 Winter Olympics and 6th at the 1998 World Championships.

Punsalan/Swallow ended their eligible career in 1998 and continued to skate in shows for a number of years. Swallow is managing director at the Detroit Skating Club in Bloomfield Hills, Michigan.

Results

Ice dancing with Punsalan

Ice dancing with Balogh

Pair skating with Propson

References

American male ice dancers
Olympic figure skaters of the United States
Figure skaters at the 1994 Winter Olympics
Figure skaters at the 1998 Winter Olympics
Living people
1966 births